Libraries have been lending books to the public for thousands of years. First libraries date back to 2600 BC during Sumerian civilization. In the modern era lending books largely happens by Public Libraries. Generally worldwide public libraries are non-profit organizations offering book lending services free to their patrons and are generally funded through taxes and donations or by the state., Public libraries are accessible to general public and are run by civil servants, state employees, or volunteers. Some of the largest libraries in the world include Library of Congress in the United States of America and British Library with millions of titles in their catalogs. Besides the public libraries, private libraries also provide lending services, and are usually run by individuals, associations, or by corporate organizations and universities. Private libraries usually require a subscription or membership to the library (paid or unpaid) and provide services specific to the organization, area or university.

Book rentals
Historically before the industrial revolution, books were too expensive for commoners to buy, and there were businesses which made profit by renting out books for a fee. Kashi-hon in Japan was one of such businesses. In modern era in developing and developed nations, for-profit book rental services have started to lend physical books, audiobook CDs, e-books, and audiobook MP3s through stores and/or by an online (website) interface after popularization of the World Wide Web. Most book rental companies provide books with doorstep delivery using logistic services. Following the popular Netflix model for video rental, many book companies have applied features such as unlimited rentals, free shipping, and no late fees to their book distribution services.

Book rental models

Based on rental method 
Based on the rental method the book rental companies can be categorized into two subgroups:
 Book rental companies having a subscription-based models where a monthly or periodic subscription fee is charged and members can rent a number of books based on the subscription. 
 Book rental companies taking a fraction of book cost as rent. This is the most prevalent model in textbook and college book renting.

Based on type of book rented 
Based on the type of books that the book rental service rents following classification can be done:
 Physical or Printed Books. The category can further be subdivided into 
 Companies focusing on fiction, non-fiction, and other non-academic books.
 Companies who primarily rent academic, reference, and educational publications.
 E-book renters
Many companies renting physical books also rent e-books. Since e-book rental distribution rights are totally different from physical books many smaller companies are not able to rent e-books from standard publishers like McGraw-Hill, Pearson, Prentice Hall, Cengage, etc due to the high licensing fees required for rental rights.

See also
 3M Cloud Library
 Booksfree
 BookSwim
 Online book rental in India
 OverDrive, Inc.
 Simply Audiobooks

References

Book promotion
Reading (process)
Book rental